Johannes Buzalski (1918–1977) was a German film and television actor.

Selected filmography
 Hello, Fraulein! (1949)
 Jonny Saves Nebrador (1953)
 The Confession of Ina Kahr (1954)
 Heroism after Hours (1955)
 The Beggar Student (1956)
 Through the Forests and Through the Trees (1956)
 Go for It, Baby (1968)
 So Much Naked Tenderness (1968)
 Mark of the Devil (1970)
 Don't Fumble, Darling (1970)
 Ludwig: Requiem for a Virgin King (1972)
 Mark of the Devil Part II (1973)
 Housewives on the Job (1973)
 Uncle Silas (1977, TV series)

References

Bibliography
 Eric Rentschler. The Films of G.W. Pabst: an extraterritorial cinema. Rutgers University Press, 1990.

External links

1918 births
1977 deaths
German male television actors
German male film actors
20th-century German male actors